Atlas is an inner satellite of Saturn which was discovered by Richard Terrile in 1980  from Voyager photos and was designated . In 1983 it was officially named after Atlas of Greek mythology, because it "holds the rings on its shoulders" like the Titan Atlas held the sky up above the Earth. It is also designated .

Atlas is the closest satellite to the sharp outer edge of the A ring, and was long thought to be a shepherd satellite for this ring. However, now it is known that the outer edge of the ring is instead maintained by a 7:6 orbital resonance with the larger but more distant moons Janus and Epimetheus. In 2004 a faint, thin ring, temporarily designated , was discovered in the Atlantean orbit.

High-resolution images taken in June 2005 by Cassini revealed Atlas to have a roughly spherical centre surrounded by a large, smooth equatorial ridge. The most likely explanation for this unusual and prominent structure is that ring material swept up by the moon accumulates on the moon, with a strong preference for the equator due to the ring's thinness. In fact, the size of the equatorial ridge is comparable with the expected Roche lobe of the moon. This would mean that for any additional particles impacting the equator, the centrifugal force will nearly overcome Atlas's tiny gravity, and they will probably be lost.

Atlas is significantly perturbed by Prometheus and to a lesser degree by Pandora, leading to excursions in longitude of up to 600 km (~0.25°) away from the precessing Keplerian orbit with a rough period of about 3 years. Because the orbits of Prometheus and Pandora are chaotic, it is suspected that Atlas's may be as well.

Gallery

References 

Citations

Sources

External links 

 Atlas Profile by NASA's Solar System Exploration
 The Planetary Society: Atlas
 NASA factsheet

Moons of Saturn
Astronomical objects discovered in 1980
Atlas (mythology)
Moons with a prograde orbit